46th Brigade may refer to:
 46th Air Assault Brigade (Ukraine)
 46th Independent Infantry Brigade of the Bangladesh Army
 46th Indian Infantry Brigade
46th Infantry Brigade (United Kingdom)
 46th Brigade, 38th Infantry Division of the Michigan Army National Guard (keeping the traditions of the 46th Infantry Division)

See also

 46th Division (disambiguation)
 46th Regiment (disambiguation)
 46th Squadron (disambiguation)